Quaibrücke is a road, tramway, pedestrian and bicycle bridge over the river Limmat, at the outflow of Lake Zürich in the city of Zürich, Switzerland. It was built simultaneously with the construction of Zürich's new quays between 1881 and 1887.

Geography 
Quaibrücke is situated at the outflow of Lake Zürich and connects the Bürkliplatz with the Bellevueplatz, and hence the lake's left (or western) shore with the right (or eastern) shore. It is a nodal point of the Tram lines 2, 5, 8, 9 and 11, as well of the road traffic between General-Guisan-Quai, and Utoquai.

History

1880-1884

The Quaibrücke was erected between 1880 and 1884 under the management of Arnold Bürkli (1833–1894), the city engineer appointed in Zurich in 1860.
A modern land connection was urgently needed after an intense political campaign, as in 1893 Zurich was to be expanded by including 11 neighboring municipalities ("Vorortgemeinden").  

On May 18, 1873, the municipal council (the legislature) approved the construction of the Quay Bridge with a strong majority vote.
In a vote on September 4, 1881, the municipalities of Enge (left, west shore), Riesbach (right, east shore), and Zurich approved the financing loan.
In the outcome of the conducted tender procedure for project planning works, four submitted offers were opened on September 5, 1881. As the probes of the Zurich lake bed on the designated area revealed that it was covered by layers of mud above sandy clay loam deposits, the proposed pile foundation of the bridge was the decisive factor. Arnold Brückli's proposal was inspired by solution implemented for the building of "Neue Börse" in Basel (later known as Basler Handelsbank and ultimately the predecessor of UBS AG).
On March 18, 1882, the contract was awarded to Zurich architect Emil Schmid-Kerez, in collaboration with Philipp Holzmann & Cie. from Frankfurt and Gebrüder Benckiser from Pforzheim.
The project group undertook to complete the construction works of a 20 meters wide bridge (12 meters of roadway lanes, and 4 meters of pedestrian walks on each side) on or before July 15, 1883 against a payment of CHF 860'000.00. 

The Quaibrücke was built simultaneously with the Utoquai and General-Guisan-Quai on the two shores of Lake Zurich, but the bridge was finished half a year earlier. Since the bridge disabled the traffic on the Limmat, the landing gate of the ZSG Zürichsee-Schifffahrtsgesellschaft had to be moved from the Bauschänzli island to the present Bürkliterrasse.

1930s-1940s
In 1932, the road surface was renewed. In view of the Swiss National Exhibition 1939 and expected increase in traffic, the city council envisaged to further develop the Bellevueplatz and the Quaibrücke, and the width of the bridge was increased to 28.5 meters in 1939. 

Upon German invasion of Poland in the WWII and as part of the Zürich lakefront, two machine-gun bunkers were built in the 1940s, which are still preserved at their original sites at Limmatquai and Bürkliterrasse. The construction at Bürkliplatz was designed by the Stadtkommando Zürich (Zurich City Commando) as a concrete machine gun stand in the wall of Quaybrücke and was erected during May and June 1940 in form of a gallery with a sequence of five battle rooms ("Kampfräume") lined up next to each other. 
Due to its layout of five Kampfräume and the central location in the very heart of Zurich, the bunker was nick-named as "5-Zimmer-Villa" (five bedrooms villa). In March 2004, the site was declassified.

1983-1984

Due to rapidly increasing maintenance costs, the original construction had to be replaced in 1984, and a new bridge was built parallel to the old bridge between 1983 and 1984, on steel girders. The weekend of March 16/17, 1984, traffic was blocked and the old construction was moved on steel beams and columns in the lake which took 15 hours in total to move the old construction and replace it with a concrete slab. The construction costs totaled to 18 million CHF, and the width of the bridge measured from then on 30.5 meters. Initiatives to redesign the old bridge as a pedestrian zone were rejected.

2015
Between April and November 2015 further refurbishment works were completed with 50 cm wide steel structures added on both sides of the bridge to move the existing combination masts (lighting poles and guy masts) and free up space to be used for pedestrian and bicycle paths.

References

External links
 

Bridges in Zürich
Bunkers in Europe
Altstadt (Zürich)
Bridges completed in 1884
Bridges over the Limmat
Road bridges in Switzerland
Railway bridges in Switzerland
Pedestrian bridges in Switzerland
Lake Zurich
19th-century architecture in Switzerland